Arblaster is a surname. Notable people with the surname include:

 Bill Arblaster (1900–?), English football (soccer) player
 David Arblaster (1929–2006), Australian politician
 Julie Arblaster, Australian scientist
 Robert Arblaster (born 1948), New Zealand cricketer